Sue Wilkinson may refer to:

 Sue Wilkinson (professor), feminist academic and advocate for same-sex marriage
 Sue Wilkinson (singer), British singer